NGC 966 is an unbarred lenticular galaxy approximately 440 million light-years away from Earth in the constellation of Cetus. It was discovered by American astronomer Francis Preserved Leavenworth in 1886.

See also 
 Lenticular galaxy 
 List of NGC objects (1–1000)
 Cetus (constellation)

References

External links 
 
 SEDS

Unbarred lenticular galaxies
Cetus (constellation)
966
9626
Astronomical objects discovered in 1886
Discoveries by Francis Leavenworth